Willy Raine (born 5 January 1970 in Whistler, British Columbia) is a retired Canadian alpine skier who competed in the 1992 Winter Olympics. He is a retired technical ski coach for Alpine Canada. he currently coaches vernon ski club and owns sundial lighting.

Raine is the son of Nancy Greene and Al Raine.

References

External links
 Willy Raine at sports-reference.com

1970 births
Living people
Canadian male alpine skiers
Olympic alpine skiers of Canada

Alpine skiers at the 1992 Winter Olympics
Sportspeople from British Columbia